The 2010 Asian Men's Handball Championship was the 14th edition of the Asian Men's Handball Championship, held in Beirut, Lebanon, from 6 to 19 February 2010. It acted as the Asian qualifying tournament for the 2011 World Men's Handball Championship in Sweden.

Draw

* Following the IOC decision to suspend the NOC of Kuwait which came in force on 1 January 2010, the International Handball Federation decided to suspend handball in Kuwait in all categories.  Following this decision Iraq replaced Kuwait in Group B to balance the number of teams in each group.

Preliminary round
All times are local (UTC+2).

Group A

Group B

Group C

Group D

Placement 9th–12th

9th–12th semifinals

11th/12th

9th/10th

Main round

Group E

Group F

Placement 5th–8th

7th/8th

5th/6th

Final round

Semifinals

Bronze medal match

Gold medal match

Final standing

References

External links
www.asianhandball.com
www.handball.jp
Results
www.goalzz.com

Asian
Handball
Handball
Asian Handball Championships
February 2010 sports events in Asia